= Barry Wilkinson (author) =

- Born: 22 September 1953 (age 72); Rochdale
- Education: Bolton School (Boys' Division) (Left 1970), Sheffield University (Dates 1971 to 1975)
- Occupations: Author, speaker, management consultant and business coach
- Website: www.wilkinsonread.co.uk

Barry Wilkinson is a British author, speaker, management consultant and business coach who specialises in helping Law Firms.

== Early career ==
Barry's early career was spent as a cost and management accountant in the glass and motor industries. He then joined RTZ (now Rio Tinto) as an internal consultant, before acting as finance director in the turnaround of problem subsidiaries in manufacturing and service sectors. He founded Wilkinson Read & Partners as a cost-reduction consultancy in 1993. By chance, several of the early clients were law firms, though through the 90s the client base grew to include major organisations in Financial Services, Retail as well as professional services. In this period, his work at Bradford and Bingley won third place in "employee communication of the year".

Since 2002 Barry and Wilkinson Read have focused exclusively on helping "human sized" Law firms become more successful. This not only means improving Financial Performance, but also developing the firm and its people so that both staff and clients are more satisfied.

Some of Barry's more innovative approaches to Performance improvement have their roots in the "World Class Manufacturing" movement which came from Japan to simultaneously improve quality of products and services, whilst dramatically reducing costs and wastage.

== Current career ==
An example of this is his approach to cash-flow management, which focuses relentlessly on time elapsed, leading not only to greatly reduced borrowings, but also to improved client satisfaction, and reduced complaints.

More recently, he has enhanced this approach to help fee earners develop the additional skills and confidence to handle client conversations – increasing their perceived value to the client and addressing the other source of Client complaints, Poor communication.

In 2015 he introduced the concept of "beyond benchmarking". Whilst many law firms measure their performance by peer comparison, using benchmarking surveys to rate themselves, new entrants to the legal sector who have a financially driven agenda see opportunities to achieve much more, using techniques from other sectors in which they operate. After analysing the financial management approaches used by some of these entrants, Barry uses these in a programme to enhance potential and actual results.

== Books ==
- Cash Flow Management for Law Firms
- Cash Flow Management for Law Firms, 2nd Edition
